Admesturius schajovskoyi is a species of spider classified as a family of the jumping spider. The scientific name of this species was first published in 1988 by Galianol. These spiders are commonly found in Argentina and Chile.

References
 : The world spider catalog, version 10.5.  American Museum of Natural History .

schajovsokyi
Spiders of South America
Arthropods of Argentina
Arthropods of Chile
Spiders described in 1988